Tunceli Province, formerly Dersim Province, is located in the Eastern Anatolia Region of Turkey. It was originally named Dersim Province (Dersim vilayeti), then demoted to a district (Dersim kazası) and incorporated into Elazığ Province in 1926. The province is considered part of Turkish Kurdistan and has a Kurdish majority. Moreover, it is the only province in Turkey with an Alevi majority.

The province, apart from the central district, is divided into seven districts named Çemişgezek, Hozat, Mazgirt, Nazımiye, Ovacık, Pertek and Pülümür.

The province has eight municipalities, 366 villages and 1,087 hamlets.

Geography 

The adjacent provinces are Erzincan to the north and west, Elazığ to the south, and Bingöl to the east. Tunceli is traversed by the northeasterly line of equal latitude and longitude. The Munzur Valley National Park is also situated in the province.

Tunceli Province is a plateau characterized by its high, thickly forested mountain ranges. The historical region of Dersim, which largely corresponds to Tunceli Province, lies roughly between the Karasu and Murat rivers, both tributaries of the Euphrates.

Name 
Tunceli, which is a modern name, literally means "bronze fist" in Turkish (tunç meaning "bronze" and eli (in this context) meaning "fist"). It shares the name with the military operation that the Dersim Massacre was conducted under.

It has been proposed that the name Dersim is connected with various placenames mentioned by ancient and classical writers, such as Daranis, Derxene (a district of Armenia mentioned by Pliny), and Daranalis/Daranaghi (a district of Armenia mentioned by Ptolemy, Agathangelos, and Faustus of Byzantium). One theory as to the origin of the name associates it with Darius the Great. 

One Armenian folk tradition derives the name Dersim from a certain 17th-century priest named Der Simon, who, fearing the maurading Celali rebels, proposed that his parishioners convert to the Alevi faith of their Kurdish neighbors. The proposal was accepted, and the Armenian converts renamed their home region Dersimon in honor of their religious leader, which later transformed into Dersim.

History

Antiquity 
This region was known as Ishuva in the 2000s BC. As a result of the struggle of the Ishuva Kingdom, which was established by the Hurrians in the region, with the Hittites, the region came under the rule of the Hittites in the 1600s BC. Then, it came under the domination of the Urartians and formed the westernmost part of the country of Urartu. After that, it was ruled by Medes and the Persian Achaemenid Empire, and after that it was ruled by Alexander the Great, king of Macedon.

Ottoman Empire rule 

Although the  presence of Ottoman Empire was beginning to be felt in the region after Mehmed II the Conqueror defeated the Aq Qoyunlu in 1473, its incorporation into Ottoman lands took place after the Battle of Chaldiran in 1514, during the reign of Selim the Grim. However, the harsh and rugged geographical structure of the region helped preserved its autonomy, keeping the control of the region away from the centralized government. The people of Dersim displayed rebellious attitudes during the weak periods of the central administrations. Various Armenian and Alevi Kurdish rebellions took place in the region in 1877, 1885, 1892, 1907, 1911, 1914 and 1916.

In Turkey 
With the abolition of the Ottoman Empire, Turkey became the owner of the region. In 1935, the Tunceli Law was passed, which established a state of emergency in the region, changed its name to Tunceli and made it a separate province consisting of the Nazımiye, Hozat, Mazgirt, Pertek, Ovacık, and Çemişgezek districts of Elazığ Province and the Pülümür District of Erzincan Province. In January 1936, the Fourth Inspectorate-General (Umumi Müfettişlik, UM) was created, which spanned the provinces of Elazığ, Erzincan, Bingöl and Tunceli and was governed by a Governor-Commander, who had the authority to evacuate whole villages and resettle them in other regions. This effectively established military rule in those provinces, and significant military infrastructure was established in the region. Judicial guarantees such as the right to appeal were suspended, and the Governor-Commander had the right to apply the death penalty, whereas normally this would have to be approved by the Grand National Assembly of Turkey. In 19371938, the Dersim rebellion took place in Tunceli Province and the adjacent regions, which resulted in the massacre of 30,000 Kurds and displacement of tens of thousands of inhabitants of the region by Turkish forces. In 1946 the Tunceli Law was abolished and the state of emergency removed but the authority of the Fourth UM was transferred to the military. Some of the deported families were allowed to return home. The Inspectorates-General were dissolved in 1952 during the government of the Democrat Party.

Since the 1970s, Tunceli Province has been a stronghold for insurgent groups such as the Communist Party of Turkey/Marxist–Leninist and the Kurdistan Workers' Party.

Name changes 
Before and after the Dersim rebellion, any villages and towns deemed to have non-Turkish names were renamed and given Turkish names in order to suppress any non-Turkish heritage. During the Turkish Republican era, the words Kurdistan and Kurds were banned. The Turkish government had disguised the presence of the Kurds statistically by categorizing them as Mountain Turks.

Linguist Sevan Nişanyan estimates that 4,000 Kurdish geographical locations have been changed (both Zazaki and Kurmanji). Prior to the name changes, Many villages in Tunceli had recognizably Armenian names, often in corrupted forms. The people of Tunceli have been actively fighting to get their province reverted to its old Kurdish name "Dersim". Turkey's ruling Justice and Development Party (AK Party) claimed they are working on what it called a “democratization package” that includes the restoration of the Kurdish name of the eastern province of Tunceli back to Dersim in early 2013, but there has been no updates or news of it since then. The local authority decided to call it Dersim in May 2019, while the Governor said it was against the law to call it Dersim.

Demographics 

Tunceli Province has the lowest population density of any province in Turkey, at just 11 inhabitants/km2.

Language 
In 1927, Tunceli's language distribution was 69.5% Kurmanji Kurdish and Zazaki, 29.8% Turkish and 0.74% Armenian. Kurmanji Kurdish is the main dialect around Pertek, while Zazaki is spoken in Hozat, Pülümür, Ovacık and Nazımiye. Both Kurmanji and Zaza are spoken in Tunceli town and Mazgirt.

Alevis

The heartland and sacred land of Kurdish Alevis is the Dersim region. The region's isolation has insulated it from the influence of Turkey's dominant Sunni sect of Islam, helping to keep its unique Alevi character relatively pure.

Armenians of Dersim
Dersim had a large Armenian population prior to the Armenian genocide, with one estimate placing it at 45 percent of the total population of the region. The districts of Mazgirt, Nazımiye and Çemişgezek had large Armenian populations during the Ottoman period.

The region is home to the ruins of a number of Armenian monasteries and churches, such as St. Karapet Monastery, which remains an object of reverence for Alevi Zaza-Kurds in Dersim today. The Armenians and Alevi Zaza-Kurds of the region had generally good relations. During the Armenian genocide, many of the Kurds of Dersim saved thousands of Armenians by hiding them or helping them reach the positions of the Russian army. Some of the region's Armenian inhabitants that managed to survive converted to Alevism, and an unknown number of inhabitants of the province today have Armenian roots. Distinctly Armenian settlements continued to exist in parts of Dersim until the massacre of 1938, after which the remaining Armenians completely assimilated into the Alevi Kurdish population. An organization called Union of Dersim Armenians has been founded in Turkey by people from Dersim seeking to reconnect with their Armenian identity.

Politics 

In the municipal elections held in March 2019, Fatih Mehmet Maçoğlu was elected mayor of Tunceli municipality with 32% of the votes cast (Maçoğlu had previously been elected mayor of Ovacık in 2014). He ran as the candidate of the Communist Party of Turkey (TKP), making him the first communist mayor of a municipality in Turkey. In his first year in office, he has established free public transport in parts of the city. The development of industrial and agricultural cooperatives, which are meant to tackle unemployment, has already begun.

Tunceli recorded the  strongest "No" vote at 80.42% during the 2017 Turkish constitutional referendum. Previously, the province had recorded the strongest "No" vote at 81.02% during the 2010 Turkish constitutional referendum.

The province is a stronghold for pro-Kurdish parties as well as the Republican People's Party.

Latest general election results

June 2015

November 2015

2018

Education 
Tunceli University was established on May 22, 2008. Tunceli is famous for excellent rankings in National Education statistics.

Places of interest 

Tunceli is known for its old buildings such as the Çelebi Ağa Mosque, Elti Hatun Mosque, Mazgirt Castle, Pertek Castle, and the Derun-i Hisar Castle.

Notable people 

 John I Tzimiskes (925–976) - Byzantine emperor between 969 and 976
 Seyid Riza (1863–1937) - Alevi Zaza-Kurdish political leader of the Alevi Zaza-Kurds of Dersim, a religious figure and the leader of the Dersim movement in Turkey during the 1937–1938 Dersim Rebellion
 Nuri Dersimi (1893–1973) - Kurdish nationalist writer, revolutionary and intellectual
 Aurora Mardiganian (1901–1994) - Armenian author, actress, and a survivor of the Armenian genocide
 Vazken Andréassian (1903–1995) - Armenian engineer, author, and a survivor of the Armenian genocide
  (1909–1996) - Armenian author, editor, and a survivor of the Armenian genocide 
  (1935–1971) - Kurdish nationalist writer and revolutionary
 Kemal Burkay (1937) - Kurdish writer and politician
 Kamer Genç (1940–2016) - Turkish politician
 Kemal Kılıçdaroğlu (1948) - economist, retired civil servant, social democratic politician and leader of the Republican People's Party
 Mehmet Ali Eren (1951) - Kurdish politician
 Ali Haydar Kaytan (1952–2021) - Kurdish militant, co-founder of the Kurdistan Workers' Party
 Gülşen Aktaş (1957) - educator and social worker of Kurdish origin
 Hıdır Aslan (1958–1984) - Kurdish rebel
 Sakine Cansız (1958–2013) - Kurdish activist, co-founder of the Kurdistan Workers' Party
 Hamide Akbayir (1959) - German politician of Kurdish descent
 Edibe Şahin (1960) - Kurdish politician, former mayor of the municipality of Tunceli
 Hüseyin Kenan Aydın (1962) - German politician of Kurdish descent
 Hasan Saltık (1964) - Turkish record producer of mixed Turkish and Kurdish descent
 Ferhat Tunç (1964) - Kurdish singer, songwriter and musician
 Hozan Diyar (1966) - Kurdish singer
 Alican Önlü (1967) - Kurdish politician
 Fatih Mehmet Maçoğlu (1968) -  Kurdish politician, currently the mayor of the municipality of Tunceli
 Hüseyin Aygün (1970) - Zaza-Kurdish lawyer and politician
 Kenan Engin (1974) -  German-Kurdish political scientist
 Nilüfer Gündoğan (1974) - Dutch politician of Kurdish descent
 Aynur Doğan (1975) - Kurdish singer and songwriter
 Hülya Oran (1978) - Kurdish militant, one of leaders of Kurdistan Workers' Party and is the co-chair of the Kurdistan Communities Union
  (1981) - actor of Zaza-Kurdish descent

Originating from Tunceli 

 Turgut Özal (1927–1993) - 8th president of Turkey, he was of mixed Turkish and Kurdish descent
 Gültan Kışanak (1961) - Kurdish journalist, author and politician
 Yıldız Tilbe (1966) - singer of Kurdish descent
 Gülnaz Karataş (1971-1992) - Kurdish female fighter
 Dilan Yeşilgöz-Zegerius (1977) - Dutch politician of Kurdish descent, current Minister of Justice and Security in Netherlands
 Zuhal Demir (1980) - Belgian lawyer and politician of Kurdish origin, current Flemish minister of Environment, Justice, Tourism and Energy
 Fırat Çelik (1981) - German-Turkish actor of Zaza-Kurdish descent

References

Notes

External links 
 Official Homepage of the Province Governor
 Official Homepage of the Culture and Tourism head office
 Official Homepage of the Education head office
 Official Homepage of the health head office
 Tunceli University. Archived 7 August 2014.

 
Provinces of Turkey
Turkish Kurdistan